Cacostatia is a genus of moths in the subfamily Arctiinae.

Species
 Cacostatia acutipennis Rothschild, 1912
 Cacostatia buckwaldi Rothschild, 1912
 Cacostatia discalis (Walker, 1856)
 Cacostatia flaviventralis Dognin, 1909
 Cacostatia germana Rothschild, 1912
 Cacostatia ossa (Druce, 1893)
 Cacostatia saphira (Staudinger, 1875)

References

External links
Natural History Museum Lepidoptera generic names catalog

Arctiinae